Chris Dyson  (born 6 October 1964) is an English architect. He established Chris Dyson Architects. in 2003. He is known for residential conservation architecture.

Early career 

Chris Dyson studied architecture at Oxford Brookes University and Mackintosh School of Architecture in Glasgow.  He worked at James Stirling Michael Wilford and Associates on projects including Abando International passenger exchange. in Bilbao and Temasek Polytechnic in Singapore.

He spent three years as a design director at Sir Terry Farrell's practice Farrells.

Chris Dyson Architects 
Chris Dyson Architects was set up in 2003, by Chris Dyson in partnership with Mathew Witts. Their first major project was a design for a museum of African Art and Culture, which was not realised.

Based in a restored pub in Spitalfields, London for which they received an RIBA Award, Chris Dyson Architects has completed a number of refurbishment and heritage conservation projects of houses in and around London alongside civic arts projects in London.

Notable works

Chris Dyson Architects 

 Crystal Palace Park Cafe (2019)
Albion Works, (2018)
The Sekforde Arms (2018)
Harrow Arts Centre,
 Eleven Spitalfields, London (2017)
 The Queen's Head (2017)
 Weaver's House (2017)
The Cooperage, Clerkenwell (2016)
Gasworks (2014)
 House in Wapping Pierhead, London (2013)
 Museum of African Art and Culture, South Africa, (unbuilt 2004)

Terry Farrell & Partners 
Lots Road Power Station, London (2017)
The King Key Tower Shenzhen, Shenzhen, China (2011)
The CITIC headquarters, Beijing (2011)
Swiss Cottage Masterplan, Sports and Leisure building, London (2006)

James Stirling Michael Wilford & Partners 

Singapore Arts Centre, Singapore
The British Embassy, Berlin (2000)
Tate Liverpool, New sculpture and Temporary exhibition space (1998)
Temasek Polytechnic, Singapore (1996)
Abando International Passenger Interchange, Bilbao (unbuilt 1985-1992)
Headquarters and Design facilities for RARE, Leicestershire
B. Braun Melsungen New Administration Building and Masterplan (1992)
Headquarters and Production Facilities for STO Weizen (2003)
Music School and House of History, Stuttgart (1994)
Regional Headquarters building, B.Braun, Switzerland (2001)
Seville Stadium redevelopment, Seville

References

Bibliography 
Dyson, Chris, (2009) 2Eight/five Chris Dyson Architects 
Dyson, Chris: Maxwell, Robert; Pallister, James; Winterson, Jeanette; McFadyen, Jock (2014)  Practise and Projects : Chris Dyson Architects

External links 

 Chris Dyson Architects
 Interview in The Modern House 
 Architecture Masters Podcast 

Architects from London
Modernist architects from England
Alumni of the Glasgow School of Art
Alumni of Oxford Brookes University
21st-century English architects
20th-century English architects
Conservation architects
1964 births
Living people